Opdalingen is a local online and print newspaper published in Oppdal and Rennebu, Norway. Published in tabloid format, the newspaper had a circulation of 2,214 in 2013. The newspaper is owned by Amedia. It has three weekly issues, on Tuesdays, Thursdays and Saturdays. The newspaper was founded in 1934 and competes with Opp.

References

1934 establishments in Norway
Amedia
Newspapers published in Norway
Norwegian-language newspapers
Oppdal
Publications established in 1934
Mass media in Trøndelag